Martin Vlach may refer to:
 Martin Vlach (electrical engineer)
 Martin Vlach (pentathlete)